Sameodes finbaralis is a moth in the family Crambidae. It is found in the Philippines (Luzon).

The wingspan is about 29 mm.

References

Moths described in 1927
Spilomelinae